Schrader Hill is a summit located in Central New York Region of New York located in the Towns of Herkimer and Newport in Herkimer County, north of Herkimer

References

Mountains of Herkimer County, New York
Mountains of New York (state)